Skorvehallet Slope is a snow-covered slope with numerous rock outcrops, lying just west of the Gagarin Mountains in the Orvin Mountains, Queen Maud Land. Mapped by Norwegian cartographers from air photos and surveys by Norwegian Antarctic Expedition, 1956–60, and named Skorvehallet.

Ice slopes of Queen Maud Land
Princess Astrid Coast